Curley Culp (March 10, 1946 – November 27, 2021) was an American football defensive lineman who was a defensive tackle in the American Football League (AFL) and National Football League (NFL). He played college football at Arizona State University, where he was also an NCAA heavyweight wrestling champion. He played football professionally in the AFL for the Kansas City Chiefs in 1968 and 1969, and in the NFL for the Chiefs, Houston Oilers, and Detroit Lions. He was an AFL All-Star in 1969 and a six-time AFC–NFC Pro Bowler.

Early life and education
Curley Culp grew up in Yuma, Arizona, the youngest of 13 children including a twin sister, Shirley. At Yuma Union High School, he was a standout first in football and then in wrestling, winning Arizona high school wrestling state titles as a heavyweight in 1963 and 1964. He was recruited to Arizona State University to play both sports.

Collegiate career

Wrestling

At Arizona State, Culp amassed a 84–11–1 record, three Western Athletic Conference championships, and was the 1967 NCAA heavyweight champion, winning the Gorriaran Award for scoring the most pins at the NCAA Division I Wrestling Championships.

Football
Under legendary Arizona State football coach Frank Kush, Culp played nose guard, including on the 1967 team that allowed opponents an average of only 79.8 yards per game. He won All-America honors in football, as well as wrestling.

Professional career

Kansas City Chiefs
The Denver Broncos drafted Culp in the second round of the 1968 NFL Draft, but considered him too small for the defensive line at 6'1" and 265 lbs. After trying him at guard, they dealt him during training camp to the Kansas City Chiefs in exchange for a fourth-round draft pick (Mike Schnitker). He played for Kansas City for seven seasons, appearing in 82 games, achieving nine sacks in 1973 with nine QB takedowns, and also recovering five fumbles during his career with the team.

Culp's role as a nose tackle in the pros actually took root in Super Bowl IV, where he was a starting defensive tackle.  Chiefs coach Hank Stram, in an attempt to nullify the Minnesota Vikings' quick outside rushing attack, decided to line Culp directly nose-to-nose with Vikings center, Mick Tingelhoff.  The smaller Tingelhoff could not block Culp one-on-one and had to be helped by the other linemen.  This freed teammates Buck Buchanan, Willie Lanier, and other Chiefs defenders to get into the Vikings offensive backfield and shut down their running game. The effectiveness of the Chiefs' defensive game plan helped continue the growing popularity of the 3–4 scheme in the 1970s from the college to pro ranks.

Houston Oilers
When Culp arrived in Houston, Bum Phillips was the defensive coordinator for Sid Gillman.  He had convinced the head coach to try a 3-4 defense, employing three down linemen and four linebackers, eschewing the standard 4–3 fronts of the day. In basically an exchange of defensive tackles who had threatened to jump to the World Football League, the Oilers acquired Culp and a first-round draft choice in 1975 from the Chiefs for John Matuszak on October 22, 1974. Both Culp and Matuszak had signed contracts with the Southern California Sun and Shreveport Steamer respectively. It became known as one of the most lopsided trades in NFL history, made worse for the Chiefs when the Oilers selected Robert Brazile with the draft pick.

Culp was so strong he required two and three players to block him, opening lanes for Elvin Bethea, Gregg Bingham, Ted Washington, Sr. and later Brazile. Houston won seven of their remaining nine games after Curley came to Houston. As Phillips later said, "Curley made (the 3–4 defense) work. He made me look smart."

Playing as a nose tackle, Culp suffered injuries, and age began to take its toll. Midway through the 1980 season, Culp was released and was claimed by Detroit, where he stayed an additional season before closing out his 14-year NFL career.

So great was his impact that the Sporting News named Culp to the All-Century teams of both the Kansas City and Houston/Tennessee franchises. Hall-Of-Famer center Jim Otto of the Raiders called him "perhaps the strongest man I ever lined up against".

Legacy
Culp is regarded as the NFL's greatest nose tackle. He played a total of 13 seasons in the AFL/NFL, and was selected to a total of six AFL All-Star Games or Pro Bowls. He was twice honored as the Associated Press Defensive Player of the Week. In 1975, he won All-Pro honors and was chosen NFL Defensive Player of the Year by the Newspaper Enterprise Association and as such received the George Halas Trophy.

He was inducted into the Arizona State University Sports Hall of Fame at its inception in 1975, and was named Greatest Athlete in the history of Arizona during the state's centennial in 2006.

Culp is a member of the Kansas City Chiefs 25-Year All-Time Team, and in March 2008 was inducted into the Chiefs Hall of Fame.

On August 3, 2013, he was inducted into the Pro Football Hall of Fame.

Death
Culp announced on November 16, 2021, that he had been diagnosed with Stage IV pancreatic cancer. He died eleven days later at the age of 75.

See also
 List of American Football League players

References

External links
 Curley Culp, Pro Football Hall of Fame

1946 births
2021 deaths
People from Yuma, Arizona
American football defensive linemen
Arizona State Sun Devils football players
Arizona State Sun Devils wrestlers
Kansas City Chiefs players
Houston Oilers players
Detroit Lions players
American Football League All-Star players
American Conference Pro Bowl players
Players of American football from Arizona
American Football League players
Pro Football Hall of Fame inductees
American twins
Deaths from pancreatic cancer
Deaths from cancer in Texas